Vatnsdalshólar ("Vatnsdalskullarna") is a hill group located in the Northwestern Region, Iceland. They are located at the northern end of Vatnsdalur in an area measuring approximately 5.5 km2.

Landslides are common in Vatnsdalur valley, especially near the Vatnsdalshólar hills, which are composed of loose stone and gravel.

See also
 Breast-shaped hill
 Capital punishment in Iceland

References

External links

Vatnsdalshólar – Iceland Road Guide

Geography of Iceland